is a railway station on the Yokosuka Line in Kamakura, Kanagawa, Japan, operated by East Japan Railway Company (JR East).

Lines
Kamakura Station is served by the Yokosuka Line and Shōnan-Shinjuku Line. It is also the terminal station for the Enoshima Electric Railway, whose station is adjacent.

Station layout

JR East Station
JR Kamakura Station has a single island platform connected to the station building by two underpasses. Beside the two main lines there is also one additional line where trains can stop. Because the platform is built on a hill, its elevation is higher than the ticket gates and Enoden platform.

Because the station serves a popular tourist area, there are many extra trains at weekends and holidays. However, in spite of the extra side line for trains to stop in, trains cannot change direction at this station, so many trains meant to serve this station have to run between Zushi and Tamachi Depot. In the evening, passenger trains also run from Tamachi Depot to Zushi, then back to Kamakura.

In most areas with stairs there are elevators and escalators. There are also two automatic vending machines for Green car (first class) tickets for use with Suica on the platform.

At the station's east exit there were previously several shops, especially restaurants. Besides a convenience store and a Kamakura tourist information center, the first floor consists entirely of eateries. There is a "Midori no Madoguchi" staffed ticket counter the east entrance, which operates during the hours 7:00 to 20:00.

Enoshima Electric Railway Station

The Enoshima Electric Railway (Enoden) has a ground-level bay platform around two tracks. The platforms are numbered in coordination with the JR lines, so that Enoden uses lines designated as 3 through 5, the signs of which are controlled by machine, usually displaying only 3 and 4. Line 5 is used only for the early morning train that departs at 5:47. During this time, there is already a train in line 3, and in order to change the order of trains on the tracks (that of two-car and four-car trains) line 5 is used. In the periods around New Year, Golden Week, and other busy times, a special, staggered schedule using the two lines 3 and 5.

An entrance ticket at other Enoden stations is 190 yen (as of September 2012), but in order to match JR, which shares the Kamakura station, the ticket is 130 yen at Kamakura station, although this ticket can only be used on the Enoden side.

At the time of introduction of Pasmo, automatic ticket gates were installed in both Kamakura Station and Fujisawa Station.

JR platforms

Enoshima Electric Railway platforms

Bus service

East exit

Kamakura station bus terminal 

 Bus stop number 1

 Bus stop number 2

 Bus stop number 3

 Bus stop number 4

 Bus stop number 5

 Bus stop number 6

 Bus stop number 7

West Exit

Kamakura Shiyakusyo-mae bus stop

History

Kamakura Station opened on 16 June 1889 as a station on a spur line from Ōfuna on the Japanese Government Railways (JGR), the pre-war predecessor to the Japan National Railways (JNR) to serve the Yokosuka Naval Arsenal and related Imperial Japanese Navy facilities at Yokosuka. This line was renamed the Yokosuka Line in October 1909. The terminus of the Enoshima Electric Railway was relocated to Kamakura Station on 1 March 1949. All freight operations were stopped in 1962. The station building was rebuilt in October 1984. The station came under the management of JR East upon the privatization of the Japanese National Railways (JNR) on 1 April 1987.

Station numbering was introduced to the Enoshima Electric Railway January 2014 with Kamakura being assigned station number EN15. The JR East platforms received station numbers in 2016 with Kamakura being assigned station numbers JO07 for the Yokosuka line and JS07 for the Shonan-Shinjuku line.

References
 Harris, Ken and Clarke, Jackie. Jane's World Railways 2008–2009. Jane's Information Group (2008).

External links

 Kamakura Station information (JR East)  
 Enoden website  

Railway stations in Kanagawa Prefecture
Railway stations in Japan opened in 1889
Yokosuka Line
Buildings and structures in Kamakura, Kanagawa
Stations of Enoshima Electric Railway